MTFP may refer to:
 Montana Free Press, news organization
 Medium Term Fiscal Plan, as used by the Finance Commission of India
 Museum Teacher Fellowship Program, from the United States Holocaust Memorial Museum
 Music Theater Foundation of the Philippines, a non-profit organization founded by Fides Cuyugan-Asensio

See also 
 MTFP1 (gene), mitochondrial fission process 1, known as MTP18, human gene